The Attack is a multidirectional shooter video game created, designed, and implemented by Jim Pettingell for the TI-99/4A home computer and published by Texas Instruments in 1981. The game was  developed at Milton Bradley as Alien Attack, inspired by the movies Alien (1979) and Barbarella (1968). After being sold to TI, the name was changed to The Attack.

Gameplay
The player flies a spaceship in four directions around a single screen, shooting "spores", which connect together to form new aliens, and already formed aliens before they eat the player. Incubators, shown as square boxes, release more spores or, in later levels, aliens.

There are four skill levels: Novice, Intermediate, Master, and Pro.

Reception

See also
Alien (Atari 2600)

References

External links
 The Attack at TI-99/4A-Pedia
 Gameplay video at YouTube

1981 video games
Multidirectional shooters
Texas Instruments games
TI-99/4A games
Video games about extraterrestrial life
Video games developed in the United States
Milton Bradley Company video games